"Your Alibis" is the debut single by the fifteen-year-old Lisa Stansfield. The song was written and produced by David Pickerill and Paul O'Donoughue. "Your Alibis" was released by the Devil Records in the United Kingdom in 1981. It was also issued by Dureco Benelux in the Netherlands in 1982. The single's B-side included another song recorded by Stansfield, "The Thought Police." Both songs were released on the In Session album in 1996. "The Thought Police" was also recorded by The Editors who released it as a single on Devil Records in 1981.

Track listings
Dutch/UK 7" single
"Your Alibis" – 4:07
"The Thought Police" – 3:15

References

Lisa Stansfield songs
1981 debut singles
1981 songs